Loria Raquel Dixon Brautigam is a Nicaraguan politician, the first black person elected to the Nicaraguan National Assembly. She was elected to represent the North Atlantic Autonomous Region of Nicaragua in 2006.

References

Year of birth missing (living people)
Living people
21st-century Nicaraguan women politicians
21st-century Nicaraguan politicians
Members of the National Assembly (Nicaragua)